Sitaare Zameen Par - Television Ka Maha Event is an Indian reality television show that airs on Sony TV starting 17 March 2008. 

The show will house three programs under its umbrella, Bura Na Mano Holi Hai, Mr. and Ms. Television, and Ustaadon Ka Ustaad. In this Maha Event, television stars will celebrate a weeklong Holi special with masti, music, dancing and a riot of colors. The television stars compete for the Mr. & Ms Television title. The last of the events is a face off between the stars of all reality shows on Indian television on one platform.

Bura Na Mano Holi Hai
Bura Na Mano Holi Hai (English: Don't mind It's Holi) is an Indian one-week comedy show that airedfrom March 17 to March 23, 2008. The show was a four-part comic reality series of pranks, gags, music and dance, where actors played pranks on celebrities all in the name of Bura Na Mano Holi Hai. Besides entertaining the viewers, the show is also designed to educate the viewers on the origin and significance of Holi. The show is produced by Wizcraft.

Participants
 Ali Asgar as the Anchor
 Raju Srivastav
 Rakhi Sawant
 Kavita Kaushik
 Kunal Kapoor

Grand finale performers
 Aamir Ali
 Sanjeeda Sheikh
 Rakhi Sawant
 Manav Gohil
 Shama Sikander
 Jay Bhanushali
 Sayantani Ghosh
 Yash Tonk
 Sangeeta Ghosh
 Roshni Chopra
 Pulkit Samrat
 Gurdeep Kohli
 Shradhdha Nigam
 Karan Oberoi
 Indian Idol band F4 and contestants - Deepali, Prajakta, Meenal and Charu

Mr. & Ms. TV
Mr. & Ms. TV was a Hindi television reality show whose purpose was to find the best of the best Hindi television stars, who would be crowned as Mr. & Ms. TV. The show was hosted by Shonali Nagrani. The show was won by Purbi Joshi and Swapnil Joshi who were crowned Ms. and Mr. TV respectively.

There were six female and six male contestants chosen and then each contestant was paired with one of the opposite gender. After the selection, the pair together had to take on challenges of dancing, dubbing, and acting each day. The performances were evaluated by judges Sonali Bendre and Madhur Bhandarkar, who would score them. The two contestants to receive the lowest total scores were then be eliminated from the competition every day.

Contestants

Men
 Karan Wahi
 Chetan Hansraj
 Kushal Punjabi
 Sanjeet Bedi
 Karanvir Bohra
 Swapnil Joshi

Women
 Aashka Goradia
 Jasveer Kaur
 Nausheen Ali Sardar
 Purbi Joshi
 Priyanka Bassi
 Shilpa Saklani

Pairs
 Purbi Joshi and Karan Wahi
 Jasveer Kaur and Kushal Punjabi
 Nausheen Ali Sardar and Karanvir Bohra
 Priyanka Bassi and Swapnil Joshi
 Shilpa Saklani and Chetan Hansraj
 Aashka Goradia and Sanjeet Bedi

Eliminations table
The elimination begins with the third day—the first two days had no elimination rounds.

Ustaadon Ka Ustaad
Ustaadon Ka Ustaad is a Hindi television reality show that is broadcasting starting 7 April 2008. This is a one week long show that is packed with singing, dancing, comedy and entertainment seen on different channels put together in one show.  Celebrities from different reality shows Indian Idol, 'Sa Re Ga Ma Pa, Voice of India, Jhalak Dhikhhla Jaa, Nach Baliye, Comedy Circus, Laughter Challenge, Li’l Champs, and Chhote Ustaad'' will vye for the title of Ustaadon Ka Ustaad.

Host
Sajid Khan

Judges
Javed Akhtar
Saroj Khan
Shekhar Suman

Winners
Kashmira Shah and Krishna Abhishek - Dance
Jayant Singh - Kids Music
Urvashi Dholakia and Shakeel Siddiqui - Comedy
Raja Hassan - Adult Music

Contestants

Dance
Jhalak Dikhhla Jaa
Sandhya Mridul and Javed Sanadi
Shveta Salve and Longi Fernandes 
Jay Bhanushali and Bindi Khare
Nach Baliye
Varun Badola and Rajeshwari Sachdeva
Kashmira Shah and Krishna Abishek
Poonam Narula Goyal and Manish Goyal

Music
Li'l Champs
Tanmay Chaturvedi
Vibhor Parashar
Vasundhara Raturi
Chhote Ustaad
Shailey Bidwaikar
Jayant Singh
Mansi Bhardwaj

Comedy
Comedy Circus
Ali Asgar and Kashif Khan
Urvashi Dholakia and Shakeel Siddiqui
Laughter Challenge
Ali Hassan and Irfan Malik
Rauf Lala and Kapil Sharma

Singing
Indian Idol
Emon Chatterjee and Amit Paul
Sa Re Ga Ma Pa
Mauli Dave and Raja Hassan
Star Voice of India
Toshi Sabri and Sumitra Iyer

Broadcast schedule
 7 April - Dance
 8 April 2008 - Kids Music
 9 April 2008 - Comedy
 10 April 2008 - Adult Music
 11 April 2008 - Curtain Raiser
 13 April 2008 - Semi-Finals
 20 April 2008 - Grand Finale

External links
Official Site

Sony Entertainment Television original programming
Indian television series